Metropilis Radio (Macedonian Cyrillic: Метрополис радио)  is private radio station from North Macedonia. The editor of the radio station is Slave Nikolovski.

References

External links

Radio stations in North Macedonia
Radio stations established in 2007
2007 establishments in the Republic of Macedonia